The People's Republic of China has developed and possesses weapons of mass destruction, including chemical and nuclear weapons. The first of China's nuclear weapons tests took place in 1964, and its first hydrogen bomb test occurred in 1967. Tests continued until 1996, when China signed the Comprehensive Test Ban Treaty (CTBT). China has acceded to the Biological and Toxin Weapons Convention (BWC) in 1984 and ratified the Chemical Weapons Convention (CWC) in 1997.

The number of nuclear warheads in China's arsenal is a state secret. There are varying estimates of the size of China's arsenal. China was estimated by the Federation of American Scientists to have an arsenal of about 260 total warheads as of 2015, the fourth largest nuclear arsenal amongst the five nuclear weapon states acknowledged by the Treaty on the Non-Proliferation of Nuclear Weapons, and one of 320 total warheads by the SIPRI Yearbook 2020, the third largest. According to some estimates by US intelligence community, the country could "more than double" the "number of warheads on missiles that could threaten the United States by the mid-2020s".

Early in 2011, China published a defense white paper, which repeated its nuclear policies of maintaining a minimum deterrent with a no-first-use pledge. China has yet to define what it means by a "minimum deterrent posture". This is together with the fact that "it is deploying four new nuclear-capable ballistic missiles, invites concern as to the scale and intention of China’s nuclear upgrade".

Chemical weapons
The People's Republic of China signed the Chemical Weapons Convention (CWC) on January 13, 1993, and ratified it on April 25, 1997.

China was found to have supplied Albania with a small stockpile of chemical weapons in the 1970s during the Cold War.

Biological weapons

China is currently a signatory of the Biological Weapons Convention and Chinese officials have stated that China has never engaged in biological activities with offensive military applications. However, China was reported to have had an active biological weapons program in the 1980s.

Kanatjan Alibekov, former director of one of the Soviet germ-warfare programs, said that China suffered a serious accident at one of its biological weapons plants in the late 1980s. Alibekov asserted that Soviet reconnaissance satellites identified a biological weapons laboratory and plant near a site for testing nuclear warheads. The Soviets suspected that two separate epidemics of hemorrhagic fever that swept the region in the late 1980s were caused by an accident in a lab where Chinese scientists were weaponizing viral diseases.

US Secretary of State Madeleine Albright expressed her concerns over possible Chinese biological weapon transfers to Iran and other nations in a letter to Senator Bob Bennett (R-Utah) in January 1997. Albright stated that she had received reports regarding transfers of dual-use items from Chinese entities to the Iranian government which concerned her and that the United States had to encourage China to adopt comprehensive export controls to prevent assistance to Iran's alleged biological weapons program. The United States acted upon the allegations on January 16, 2002, when it imposed sanctions on three Chinese firms accused of supplying Iran with materials used in the manufacture of chemical and biological weapons. In response to this, China issued export control protocols on dual use biological technology in late 2002.

A biological program in China was described in a 2015 detailed study by the Indian Ministry of Defence funded Manohar Parrikar Institute for Defense Studies and Analyses. It pointed to 42 facilities, some in the same compound, that had the capacity, possibly latently, of research, development, production or testing of biological weapons.

According to Nuclear Threat Initiative, no evidence of the program's existence has been officially released.

Nuclear weapons

History

Mao Zedong decided to begin a Chinese nuclear-weapons program during the First Taiwan Strait Crisis of 1954–1955 over the Quemoy and Matsu Islands. While he did not expect to be able to match the large American nuclear arsenal, Mao believed that even a few bombs would increase China's diplomatic credibility. As a result of the Anti-Party Group incident in Soviet Union, Khrushchev's position within the international communist bloc became insecure for a time, thus necessitating the support of Chinese Communist Party and Mao Zedong. The CCP thus traded its support for Khrushchev for Soviet technology of nuclear weapons. The Agreement on New Technology for National Defence was later signed in October, which promised Soviet support for Chinese development of nuclear weapons.

Construction of uranium-enrichment plants in Baotou and Lanzhou began in 1958, and a plutonium facility in Jiuquan and the Lop Nur nuclear test site by 1960. The Soviet Union provided assistance in the early Chinese program by sending advisers to help in the facilities devoted to fissile material production and, in October 1957, agreed to provide a prototype bomb, missiles, and related technology. The Chinese, who preferred to import technology and components to developing them within China, exported uranium to the Soviet Union, and the Soviets sent two R-2 missiles in 1958.

That year, however, Soviet leader Nikita Khrushchev told Mao that he planned to discuss arms control with the United States and Britain. China was already opposed to Khrushchev's post-Stalin policy of "peaceful coexistence". Although Soviet officials assured China that it was under the Soviet nuclear umbrella, the disagreements widened the emerging Sino-Soviet split. In June 1959, the two nations formally ended their agreement on military and technology cooperation, and in July 1960, all Soviet assistance with the Chinese nuclear program was abruptly terminated and all Soviet technicians were withdrawn from the program.

According to Arms Control and Disarmament Agency director William Foster, the American government, under Kennedy and Johnson administration, was concerned about the program and studied ways to sabotage or attack it, perhaps with the aid of Taiwan or the Soviet Union, but Khrushchev was not interested. The Chinese conducted their first nuclear test, code-named 596, on 16 October 1964,  China's last nuclear test was on July 29, 1996. According to the Australian Geological Survey Organisation in Canberra, the yield of the 1996 test was 1-5 kilotons of TNT. This was China's 22nd underground test and 45th test overall.

Size
China has made significant improvements in its miniaturization techniques since the 1980s. There have been accusations, notably by the Cox Commission, that this was done primarily by covertly acquiring the U.S.'s W88 nuclear warhead design as well as guided ballistic missile technology. Chinese scientists have stated that they have made advances in these areas, but insist that these advances were made without espionage.

The international community has debated the size of the Chinese nuclear force since the nation first acquired such technology.  Because of strict secrecy it is very difficult to determine the exact size and composition of China's nuclear forces. Estimates vary over time. Several declassified U.S. government reports give historical estimates. The 1984 Defense Intelligence Agency's Defense Estimative Brief estimates the Chinese nuclear stockpile as consisting of between 150 and 160 warheads.  A 1993 United States National Security Council report estimated that China's nuclear deterrent force relied on 60 to 70 nuclear armed ballistic missiles.  The Defense Intelligence Agency's The Decades Ahead: 1999 – 2020 report estimates the 1999 Nuclear Weapons' Inventory as between 140 and 157.  In 2004 the U.S. Department of Defense assessed that China had about 20 intercontinental ballistic missiles capable of targeting the United States.  In 2006 a U.S. Defense Intelligence Agency estimate presented to the Senate Armed Services Committee was that "China currently has more than 100 nuclear warheads."

A variety of estimates abound regarding China's current stockpile.  Although the total number of nuclear weapons in the Chinese arsenal is unknown,  estimates vary from as low as 80 to as high as 2,000.  The 2,000-warhead estimate has largely been rejected by diplomats in the field.  It appears to have been derived from a 1990s-era Usenet post, in which a Singaporean college student made unsubstantiated statements concerning a supposed 2,000-warhead stockpile.

In 2004, China stated that "among the nuclear-weapon states, China ... possesses the smallest nuclear arsenal," implying China has fewer than the United Kingdom's 200 nuclear weapons. Several non-official sources estimate that China has around 400 nuclear warheads. However, U.S. intelligence estimates suggest a much smaller nuclear force than many non-governmental organizations.

In 2011, high estimates of the Chinese nuclear arsenal again emerged. One three-year study by Georgetown University raised the possibility that China had 3,000 nuclear weapons, hidden in a sophisticated tunnel network. The study was based on state media footage showing tunnel entrances, and estimated a 4,800 km (3,000 mile) network. The tunnel network was revealed after the 2008 Sichuan earthquake collapsed tunnels in the hills. China has confirmed the existence of the tunnel network. In response, the US military was ordered by law to study the possibility of this tunnel network concealing a nuclear arsenal. However, the tunnel theory has come under substantial attack due to several apparent flaws in its reasoning.  From a production standpoint, China probably does not have enough fissile material to produce 3,000 nuclear weapons. Such an arsenal would require 9–12 tons of plutonium as well as 45–75 tons of enriched uranium and a substantial amount of tritium. The Chinese are estimated to have only 2 tons of weapons-grade plutonium, which limits their arsenal to 450–600 weapons, despite a 18-ton disposable supply of uranium, theoretically enough for 1,000 warheads.

As of 2011, the Chinese nuclear arsenal was estimated to contain 55–65 ICBMs.

In 2012, STRATCOM commander C. Robert Kehler said that the best estimates were "in the range of several hundred" warheads and FAS estimated the total to be "approximately 240 warheads".

The U.S. Department of Defense 2013 report to Congress on China's military developments stated that the Chinese nuclear arsenal consists of 50–75 ICBMs, located in both land-based silos and Ballistic missile submarine platforms.  In addition to the ICBMs, the report stated that China has approximately 1,100 short-range ballistic missiles, although it does not have the warhead capacity to equip them all with nuclear weapons.

In 2022, FAS estimated China's military stockpile in 350 nuclear warheads.

In 2023, completely different information about China nuclear stockpile appears in media from US Congress and STRATCOM official conversation.  It indicate that now China has equipped more nuclear warheads on its ICBMs than the United States (550 according to the New START treaty).

Nuclear policy
China is one of the five nuclear weapons states (NWS) recognized by the Nuclear Non-Proliferation Treaty, which China ratified in 1992. China is the only NWS to give an unqualified security assurance to non-nuclear-weapon states:
"China undertakes not to use or threaten to use nuclear weapons against non-nuclear-weapon States or nuclear-weapon-free zones at any time or under any circumstances."

Chinese public policy has always been one of the "no first use rule" while maintaining a deterrent retaliatory force targeted for countervalue targets.

In 2005, the Chinese Foreign Ministry released a white paper stating that the government "would not be the first to use [nuclear] weapons at any time and in any circumstance".  In addition, the paper went on to state that this "no first use" policy would remain unchanged in the future and that China would not use or threaten to use nuclear weapons against any non-nuclear-weapon states or nuclear-weapon-free zones.

China normally stores nuclear warheads separately from their launching systems, unless there is a heightened threat level.

China, along with all other nuclear weapon states and all members of NATO with the exception of the Netherlands, decided not to sign the UN treaty on the Prohibition of Nuclear Weapons, a binding agreement for negotiations for the total elimination of nuclear weapons.

China refused to join talks in 2020 between the U.S. and Russia on extending their bilateral New START nuclear arms reduction treaty, as the Trump administration requested. China's position is that as its nuclear warhead arsenal is a small fraction of the U.S. and Russia arsenals, their inclusion in an arms reduction treaty is unnecessary, and that it will join such talks when both U.S. and Russia has reduced their arsenal to near China's level.

Nuclear proliferation

Historically, China has been implicated in the development of the Pakistani nuclear program before China ratified the Nuclear Non-Proliferation Treaty in 1992. In the early 1980s, China is believed to have given Pakistan a "package" including uranium enrichment technology, high-enriched uranium, and the design for a compact nuclear weapon. China also received stolen technology that Abdul Qadeer Khan brought back to Pakistan and Pakistan set up a centrifuge plant in China as revealed in his letters which state "(1)You know we had cooperation with China for 15 years. We put up a centrifuge plant at Hanzhong (250km south-west of Xi'an). We sent 135 C-130 plane loads of machines, inverters, valves, flow meters, pressure gauges. Our teams stayed there for weeks to help and their teams stayed here for weeks at a time. Late minister Liu We, V. M. [vice minister] Li Chew, Vice Minister Jiang Shengjie used to visit us. (2)The Chinese gave us drawings of the nuclear weapon, gave us 50 kg enriched uranium, gave us 10 tons of UF6 (natural) and 5 tons of UF6 (3%). Chinese helped PAEC [Pakistan Atomic Energy Commission, the rival organization to the Khan Research Laboratories] in setting up UF6 plant, production reactor for plutonium and reprocessing plant."

Nuclear non-proliferation
Before the 1980s, China viewed arms control and nuclear non-proliferation regimes as mechanisms through which Western powers (particularly the U.S.) sought to restrain China. The Chinese government believed that the Treaty “[served] the interests of some States” and only favored the countries that already had nuclear weapons. Additionally, the Chinese government thought this Treaty was discriminatory since many countries were attempting to restrict and deprive nuclear weapons of a country that had only just tested them successfully, rather than countries like the U.S. or U.S.S.R., which have at least 100 times more nuclear weapons. Therefore, China chose not to join the NPT at that time. 
    
Beginning in the 1980s, China's policy and attitude toward nuclear weapons and the NPT had changed under the administration of Deng Xiaoping. Though China continued developing more advanced nuclear technology and weapons, by the 1980s, the country had indicated that it intended on accepting the terms of the NPT. Chinese Premier Zhao Ziyang provided Washington with verbal assurances that China did not advocate or encourage nuclear proliferation and that all of their nuclear tests going forward were only for improving safety features on existing warheads. In 1990, though it was not a member of the NPT, China still attended the fourth NPT review conference. While it criticized the Treaty for not banning the deployment of nuclear weapons outside national territories and for not including concrete provisions for general nuclear disarmament, China had also stated that the Treaty had a positive impact and contributed to the maintenance of world peace and stability. In August 1991, shortly after France acceded to the NPT, China also declared its intention to join, though it again expressed its reservations about the Treaty's discriminatory nature. China formally acceded to the NPT in March 1992 as a nuclear weapons state and pledged for a “No-First-Use Policy" to show its commitments to sustain the regional and international security and maintain the stability between China and other countries.

China was active in the Six-Party talks in an effort to end North Korea's nuclear program in the early 2000s. The Six-Party talks ultimately failed, and in 2006, China voted in favor of sanctioning North Korea for its nuclear program. 

The field of nuclear security has become a well-established area of successful U.S.-China cooperation. In 2009, Chinese leader Hu Jintao called for a bolstered arms control agenda at the United Nations General Assembly, joining United States President Barack Obama's earlier calls for a nuclear-free world. Precipitated by a 2010 Nuclear Security Summit convened by the Obama administration, China and the U.S. launched a number of initiatives to secure potentially dangerous, Chinese-supplied, nuclear material in countries such as Ghana or Nigeria. Through these initiatives, China and the U.S. have converted Chinese-origin Miniature Neutron Source Reactors (MNSRs) from using highly enriched uranium to using low-enriched uranium fuel (which is not directly usable in weapons, thereby making reactors more proliferation resistant).

Delivery systems estimates

2010 IISS Military Balance

The following are estimates of China's strategic missile forces from the International Institute of Strategic Studies Military Balance 2010. According to these estimates, China has up to 90 inter-continental range ballistic missiles (66 land-based ICBMs and 24 submarine-based JL-2 SLBMs), not counting MIRV warheads.

2010 DoD annual PRC military report

The following are estimates from the United States Department of Defense 2010 report to Congress concerning the Military Power of the People's Republic of China

2006 FAS & NRDC report
The following table is an overview of PRC nuclear forces taken from a November 2006 report by Hans M. Kristensen, Robert S. Norris, and Matthew G. McKinzie of the Federation of American Scientists and the Natural Resources Defense Council titled Chinese Nuclear Forces and U.S. Nuclear War Planning.

Situation in 2013–14 
After increasing during the Bush administration, the number of Chinese nuclear armed missiles capable of reaching North America leveled off during the Obama administration with delays in bringing forth new capabilities such as MIRV and operational sub launched missiles. The U.S. DOD 2013 report to Congress continued to state that China had 50–75 ICBMs. However the United States-China Economic and Security Review Commission stated that it was possible for China to finally have an operational Submarine-launched ballistic missile capability by the end of the year. The US–China Economic and Security Review Commission stated in November 2014 that patrols with nuclear-armed submarines would take place before the end of the year, "giving China its first credible sea-based nuclear deterrent".

Land-based intercontinental ballistic missiles

The Dongfeng 5A is a single-warhead, three-stage, liquid-fueled missile with a range of 13,000+ km. In 2000, General Eugene Habiger of the U.S. Air Force, then-commander of the U.S. Strategic Command, testified before Congress that China has 18 silo-based DF-5s.  Since the early 21st century, the Second Artillery Corps have also deployed up to 10 Solid-fueled mobile DF-31 ICBMs, with a range of 7,200+ km and possibly up to 3 MIRVs. China has also developed the DF-31A, an intercontinental ballistic missile with a range of 11,200+ km with possibly 3–6 multiple independently targetable reentry vehicle (MIRV) capability.

China stores many of its missiles in huge tunnel complexes; US Representative Michael Turner referring to 2009 Chinese media reports said "This network of tunnels could be in excess of 5,000 kilometers (3,110 miles), and is used to transport nuclear weapons and forces," the Chinese Army newsletter calls this tunnel system an underground Great Wall of China.

Medium-range ballistic missiles
Approximately 55% of China's missiles are in the medium-range category, targeted at regional theater targets.

DF-3A/CSS-2

DF-21/CSS-5

Tactical cruise missiles
The CJ-10 long-range cruise missile made its first public appearance in 2009 during a military parade on the 60th Anniversary of the People's Republic of China as a part of the Second Artillery Corps' long-range conventional missile forces; the CJ-10 represents the next generation in rocket weapons technology in the People's Liberation Army (PLA). A similar naval cruise missile, the YJ-62, was also revealed during the parade; the YJ-62 serves as the PLA Navy's latest development into naval rocketry.

Long-range ballistic missiles
The Chinese categorize long-range ballistic missiles as ones with a range between 3000 and 8000 km.

China "keeps most of its warheads at a central storage facility in the Qinling mountain range, though some are kept at smaller regional storage facilities."

DF-4/CSS-3

The Dong Feng 4 or DF-4 (also known as the CSS-3) is a long-range two-stage Chinese intermediate-range ballistic missile with liquid fuel (nitric acid/UDMH). It was thought to be deployed in limited numbers in underground silos beginning in 1980. The DF-4 has a takeoff thrust of 1,224.00 kN, a takeoff weight of 82,000 kg, a diameter of 2.25 m, a length of 28.05 m, and a fin span of 2.74 m. It is equipped with a 2,190 kg nuclear warhead with 3,300 kt explosive yield, and its range is 5,500 km. The missile uses inertial guidance, resulting in a relatively poor CEP of 1,500 meters.

Intercontinental ballistic missiles (ICBMs)

DF-5A/CSS-4 Mod 2

The Dongfeng 5 or DF-5 is a 3-stage Chinese ICBM. It has a length 32.6 m and a diameter of 3.35 m. It weighs 183 tonnes and has an estimated range of 12,000–15,000 kilometers. The DF-5 had its first flight in 1971 and was in operational service 10 years later. One of the downsides of the missile was that it took between 30 and 60 minutes to fuel.

DF-31/CSS-10

The Dong Feng 31 (or CSS-10) is a medium-range, three stage, solid propellant intercontinental ballistic missile developed by the People's Republic of China. It is a land-based variant of the submarine-launched JL-2.

DF-41/CSS-X-10

The DF-41 (or CSS-X-10) is an intercontinental ballistic missile believed to be operational. It is designed to carry Multiple independently targetable reentry vehicles (MIRV), delivering multiple nuclear warheads.

Nuclear cruise missiles
The US DoD estimated in 2006 that the PRC was developing ground- and air-launched cruise missiles that could easily be converted to carry nuclear warheads once developed.

DH-10

The DongHai 10 (DH-10) is a cruise missile developed in the People's Republic of China.  According to Jane's Defence Weekly, the DH-10 is a second-generation land-attack cruise missile (LACM), with over 4,000 km range, integrated inertial navigation system, GPS, terrain contour mapping system, and digital scene-matching terminal-homing system. The missile is estimated to have a circular error probable (CEP) of 10 meters.

CJ-10

The ChangJian-10 (Long Sword 10) is a cruise missile developed by China, based on the Hongniao missile family. It has a range of 2,200 km. Although not confirmed, it is suspected that the CJ-10 could carry nuclear warheads. An air-launched variant (named CJ-20) has also been developed.

HongNiao missile family

There are three missiles in this family: the HN-1, HN-2, and HN-3. Reportedly based on the Kh-SD/65 missiles, the Hongniao (or Red Bird) missiles are some of the first nuclear-capable cruise missiles in China. The HN-1 has a range of 600 km, the HN-2 has a range of 1,800 km, and the HN-3 has a range of 3,000 km.

ChangFeng missile family

There are 2 missiles in the Chang Feng (or Long Wind) family: CF-1 and CF-2. These are the first domestically developed long-range cruise missiles for China. The CF-1 has a range of 400 km while the CF-2 has a range of 800 km. Both variants can carry a 10 kt nuclear warhead.

Sea-based weapons

The submarine-launched ballistic missile (SLBM) stockpile of the People's Liberation Army Navy (PLAN) is thought to be relatively new. China launched its first second-generation nuclear submarine in April 1981. The navy currently has a 1 Type 092 Xia class SSBN at roughly 8000 tons displacement. A second Type 092 was reportedly lost in an accident in 1985. The Type 092 is equipped with 12 JL-1 SLBMs with a range of 2150–2500 km. The JL-1 is a modified DF-21 missile. It is suspected that the Type 092 is being converted into a cruise missile submarine.

The Chinese navy has developed Type 094 ballistic missile submarine, open source satellite imagery has shown that at least 2 of these have been completed. This submarine will be capable of carrying 12 of the longer ranged, more modern JL-2s with a range of approximately 14000 km.

China is also developing the Type 096 submarine, claimed to be able to carry up to 24 JL-3 ballistic missiles each. Some Chinese sources state that the submarine is already undergoing trials.

Nuclear bomber force

China's bomber force consists mostly of Chinese-made versions of Soviet aircraft. The People's Liberation Army Air Force has 120 H-6s (a variant of the Tupolev Tu-16). These bombers are outfitted to carry nuclear as well as conventional weapons. While the H-6 fleet is aging, it is not as old as the American B-52 Stratofortress. The Chinese have also produced the Xian JH-7 Flying Leopard fighter-bomber with a range and payload exceeding the F-111 (currently about 80 are in service) capable of delivering a nuclear strike. China has also bought the advanced Sukhoi Su-30 from Russia; currently, about 100 Su-30s (MKK and MK2 variants) have been purchased by China. The Su-30 is capable of carrying tactical nuclear weapons.

China is alleged to be testing rumored new H-8 and Xian H-20 strategic bombers which are either described as an upgraded H-6 or an aircraft in the same class as the US B-2, able to carry nuclear weapons.

Missile ranges

See also
Two Bombs, One Satellite
863 Program
Chinese space program
List of nuclear weapons tests of China
List of states with nuclear weapons
People's Liberation Army
Taiwan and weapons of mass destruction
Underground Great Wall of China

Further reading 

Federation of American Scientists et al. (2006). Chinese Nuclear Forces and U.S. Nuclear War Planning
China Nuclear Forces Guide Federation of American Scientists
Edouard Valensi, China's Winning Nuclear Strategy: To Blind the American Tiger, Twelve Tables Publishers, 2022.

References 

Weapons of mass destruction by country
Military of the People's Republic of China
Nuclear program of the People's Republic of China
1964 in military history